Şabaniye is a 1984 Turkish comedy film directed by Kartal Tibet.

Cast 
 Kemal Sunal - Şaban
 Çiğdem Tunç - Nazlı
 Erdal Özyagcilar - Şeyhmus
 Adile Naşit - Hatice
  - Şef Garson
 Aliye Rona - Ayşe
 Turgut Boralı - Dursun

References

External links 

1980s musical comedy films
Films shot in Istanbul
Films set in Istanbul
Cross-dressing in film
Turkish musical comedy films
Films shot in İzmir
Films set in İzmir
1984 comedy films
1984 films